Hurricane Caroline was one of two tropical cyclones to affect northern Mexico during the 1975 Atlantic hurricane season. The third named storm and second hurricane of the season, Caroline developed on August 24 north of the Dominican Republic. The system crossed Cuba and briefly degenerated into a tropical wave due to land interaction. However, upon emergence into the western Caribbean Sea, it was once again designated as a tropical depression after a well-defined circulation was observed on satellite imagery. Moving towards the west-northwest, the cyclone clipped the northern portion of the Yucatán Peninsula before entering the Gulf of Mexico. Caroline was upgraded to a tropical storm on August 29 in the central Gulf of Mexico before rapid intensification began. After moving inland, Caroline quickly weakened and dissipated over the mountainous terrain of northeastern Mexico on September 1. There were only two deaths from Caroline, both indirect. However, there was heavy rainfall in southern Texas and Mexico, including almost  at Port Isabel.

Meteorological history

A tropical wave exited the west coast of Africa on August 15 and rapidly moved westward at  along the Intertropical Convergence Zone (ITCZ). On August 22 and 23, the system changed course for the second time as it turned to the southwest. The disturbance then became Tropical Depression Five as it neared northeastern Cuba and southeastern Bahamas. It crossed Cuba where it momentarily weakened back to a tropical wave. The cyclone then regained tropical depression status on August 27 as it continued westward into the Gulf of Mexico.

On August 29, the tropical system strengthened to a tropical storm and was named Caroline by the National Hurricane Center. Caroline's forward speed slowed to  while intensifying and on the same day, Caroline was upgraded to hurricane status. Caroline rapidly weakened to a tropical depression twelve hours after landfall and dissipated on September 1 over northeastern Mexico.

Experiments
Two National Oceanic and Atmospheric Administration (NOAA) Research planes conducted experiments into Caroline. The experiments were to study and measure the wind velocity and the environment inside and around the eye as well as the boundary layer of the hurricane. The results of the experiments concluded that Caroline had a higher dissipation rate than normal hurricanes, with the dissipating rate averaging at 30%. This conclusion suggested that energy in a hurricane dissipating internally above the surface layer is two times higher than energy dissipating at the surface.

Preparations and impact

Caroline brushed the southeastern Bahamas and made landfall in eastern Cuba as a tropical depression though its effects, if any, are unknown.

The National Hurricane Center issued a hurricane watch for coastal sections of south Texas and northern Mexico on August 30. Small water craft were also advised of the deteriorating conditions. In Texas, local officials in Cameron County opened storm shelters. Relief and clean up organizations were notified of the upcoming threat while several local oil rigs evacuated personnel. In addition, relief squads from the American Red Cross moved to South Texas in case the storm made landfall. Neil Frank, the director of the National Hurricane Center advised campers along the beaches to evacuate, stating that "he doesn't want them trapped".

Due to Caroline's compact size, sustained winds only reached  in Brownsville, Texas. In Brownsville, Caroline broke a record for most rainfall within a 24-hour period during the month of August. The rainfall caused minor flooding. This helped end a prolonged drought in the Rio Grande Valley. It canceled most of the Labor Day holiday season for South Padre Island, one of the busiest weekends for tourism on the island. Overall damage in southern Texas was minor, and there were two indirect fatalities due to drowning incidents in Galveston.

In Mexico, coastal residents evacuated to storm shelters south of Tampico. Elsewhere, 300 residents were evacuated to storm shelters in Soto la Marina  from Santa Rosa. The rainfalls caused moderate flooding which caused 1,000 people to evacuate and left moderate damage to homes and businesses. The rains broke an eight-month drought that was affecting inland areas of northern Mexico that was affecting the area's corn production. Along the coast, several small villages sustained significant damage from the hurricane's storm surge.

See also 

 List of Texas hurricanes
 Hurricane Allen

References

External links
Movie of a reconnaissance flight into Caroline

Caroline
Caroline (1975)
Caroline
Caroline
1975 in Mexico
1975 natural disasters in the United States